Richard de Beauchamp, Earl of Worcester, KB (c. 1394 – c. 18 March 1421/1422) was an English peer.

The only son of William de Beauchamp, 1st Baron Bergavenny and Joan de Beauchamp, Baroness Bergavenny. William Beauchamp was the fourth son of the Earl of Warwick, and he had purchased the marcher lordship of Bergavenny from the Hastings family shortly before it died out in the male line. Joan FitzAlan was a daughter of Richard FitzAlan, 11th Earl of Arundel, who was executed by Richard II shortly before the latter's deposition. Joan was married to William in 1392 when she was 17 and he 55. There were certainly political dimensions as both families had been involved in the Lords Appellant and were also major landowners in the West Midlands and the Welsh Marches.

Documentation about Richard Beauchamp's life, particularly his young life, is scarce. His father died when he was 17, but he was outlived by his mother. Due to a conveyance executed by his parents and their lawyers, a few years before his father's death, the Bergavenny entail was temporarily broken. Joan Beauchamp would enjoy by jointure and survivorship rights for life to the entirety of the lordship of Bergavenny; the lordship, castle, manor, town and all lands attached to the lordship were hers for life, rather than passing to his son in full or 2/3rds during his mother's life.

During her widowhood (1411 - 1435) Richard's mother Joan enjoyed ownership of the lordship, castle, manor, town, appurtenances and attached lands, acquired an armed, liveried following and actively sought to expand her holdings. In legal documents, she was referred to as "Domina de Bergavenny" ("domina" being Latin feminine for "lord" or "dominus" and thus carrying a stronger connotation than "lady" in English which typically implied a style, not a title"). After his majority in 1416, Richard was never summoned to parliament as the lord of Bergavenny although his father had been, and his descendants would.

On 27 July 1411, he married Lady Isabel le Despenser, daughter of Thomas le Despenser, 1st Earl of Gloucester, and great-granddaughter of Edward III. They had one child, Lady Elizabeth de Beauchamp, later 3rd Baroness Bergavenny, who married Sir Edward Neville, later 1st Baron Bergavenny. He was joint Warden of the Welsh Marches in 1415, and a captain of lances and archers in Normandy in 1418. In February 1420/1, he was created Earl of Worcester.

Worcester was mortally wounded on 18 March 1421/2 at the Siege of Meaux and died soon after. His body was taken back to England and he was buried on 25 April 1422 at Tewkesbury, Gloucestershire. His daughter inherited his estates, although she didn't inherit Bergavenny until her grandmother, whose sole heir she was, died in 1435

Ancestry

References 

Worcester, Richard de Beauchamp, Earl of
Worcester, Richard de Beauchamp, Earl of
14th-century English nobility
15th-century English nobility
Earls of Worcester
Richard
Knights of the Bath
Barons Bergavenny (Peerage of England)
Lords of Glamorgan